Guru Har Rai (Gurmukhi: ਗੁਰੂ ਹਰਿ ਰਾਇ,; 16 January 1630 – 6 October 1661) revered as the seventh Nanak, was the seventh of ten Gurus of the Sikh religion. He became the Sikh leader at age 14, on 3 March 1644, after the death of his grandfather and the sixth Sikh leader Guru Hargobind. He guided the Sikhs for about seventeen years, till his death at age 31.

Guru Har Rai is notable for maintaining the large army of Sikh soldiers that the sixth Sikh Guru had amassed, yet avoiding military conflict. He supported the moderate Sufi influenced Dara Shikoh instead of conservative Sunni influenced Aurangzeb as the two brothers entered into a war of succession to the Mughal Empire throne.

After Aurangzeb won the succession war in 1658, he summoned Guru Har Rai in 1660 to explain his support for the executed Dara Shikoh. Guru Har Rai sent his elder son Ram Rai to represent him. Aurangzeb kept Ram Rai as hostage, questioned Ram Rai about a verse in the Adi Granth – the holy text of Sikhs at that time. Aurangzeb claimed that it disparaged the Muslims. Ram Rai changed the verse to appease Aurangzeb instead of standing by the Sikh scripture, an act for which Guru Har Rai is remembered for excommunicating his elder son, and nominating his younger son Har Krishan to succeed him. Har Krishan became the eighth Guru at age five after Guru Har Rai's death in 1661. Some Sikh literature spell his name as Hari Rai.

Biography
Guru Har Rai was born to Nihal Kaur and Baba Gurditta into a Sodhi household. His father died while he was 8 years old. At age 10, in 1640, Guru Har Rai was married to Mata Kishan Kaur (sometimes also referred to as Sulakhni) the daughter of Daya Ram. They had two children, Ram Rai and Har Krishan, the latter of whom became the eighth Guru.

Guru Har Rai had brothers. His elder brother Dhir Mal had gained encouragement and support from Shah Jahan, with free land grants and Mughal sponsorship. Dhir Mal attempted to form a parallel Sikh tradition and criticised his grand father and sixth Guru, Hargobind. The sixth Guru disagreed with Dhir Mal, and designated the younger Har Rai as the successor.

Authentic literature about Guru Har Rai life and times are scarce, he left no texts of his own and some Sikh texts composed later spell his name as "Hari Rai". Some of the biographies of Guru Har Rai written in the 18th century such as by Kesar Singh Chhibber, and the 19th-century Sikh literature are highly inconsistent.

Dara Shikoh
Guru Har Rai provided medical care to Dara Shikoh, possibly when he had been poisoned by Mughal operatives. According to Mughal records, Guru Har Rai provided other forms of support to Dara Shikoh as he and his brother Aurangzeb battled for rights to succession. Ultimately, Aurangzeb won, arrested Dara Shikoh and executed him on charges of apostasy from Islam. In 1660, Aurangzeb summoned Guru Har Rai to appear before him to explain his relationship with Dara Shikoh.

In the Sikh tradition, Guru Har Rai was asked why he was helping the Mughal prince Dara Shikoh whose forefathers had persecuted Sikhs and Sikh Gurus. Guru Har Rai is believed to have replied that if a man plucks flowers with one hand and gives it away using his other hand, both hands get the same fragrance.

Death and succession
He appointed his 5-year-old youngest son Har Krishan as the eighth Guru of the Sikhs before his death.

Influence
He started several public singing and scripture recital traditions in Sikhism. The katha or discourse style recitals were added by Guru Har Rai to the sabad kirtan singing tradition of Sikhs. He also added the akhand kirtan or continuous scripture singing tradition of Sikhism, as well as the tradition of jotian da kirtan or collective folk choral singing of scriptures.

Reforms
The third Sikh leader Guru Amar Das had started the tradition of appointing Manji (zones of religious administration with an appointed chief called sangatias), introduced the dasvandh ("the tenth" of income) system of revenue collection in the name of Guru and as pooled community religious resource, and the famed langar tradition of Sikhism where anyone, without discrimination of any kind, could get a free meal in a communal seating.

The organisational structure that had helped Sikhs to grow and resist the Mughal persecution had created new problems for Guru Har Rai. The donation collectors, some of the Masands (local congregational leaders) led by Dhir Mal – the older brother of Guru Har Rai, all of them encouraged by the support of Shah Jahan, land grants and Mughal administration – had attempted to internally split the Sikhs into competing movements, start a parallel guruship, and thereby weaken the Sikh religion. Thus a part of the challenge for Guru Har Rai was to keep Sikhs united.

He appointed new masands such as Bhai Jodh, Bhai Gonda, Bhai Nattha, Bhagat Bhagwan (for eastern India), Bhai Pheru (for Rajathan), Bhai Bhagat (also known as Bairagi), as the heads of Manjis.

Salok Mahalla Satvaan (7) 
The common Sikh belief is that Guru Hargobind, Guru Har Rai and Guru Harkrishan did not contribute to any Bani at all. This is not entirely true as Guru Har Rai is said to have wrote the Salok Mahalla Satvaan. 

This mahalla is in the Kiratpuri Bir of the Guru Granth Sahib. Although it is clearly marked as a composition of Guru Har Rai the seventh Mina Guru Miharban also used the marker leaving open the possibility of mistaken attribution. The Salok does not appear in any of the texts containing the writings of Miharban. At the same time no text about the Sikh Gurus lives reference Guru Har Rai writing Bani. It cannot therefore be securely attributed to Guru Har Rai. Gurus each had their own way of starting poems or couplets.

Guru Har Rai's was: Through the voice of Har Rai, the Guru.

Gallery

Battles
 Battle of Sutlej

References

Bibliography

External links

 Guru Har Rai, Sikhs.org
 Guru Har Rai, Sikh-History.com  
 Guru Har Rai, Official Website of Gurudwara Shri Guru Har Rai Village Bhungarni

Sikh warriors
Har Rai
1630 births
1661 deaths
Punjabi people